"Because of You" is a song by the American freestyle girl group the Cover Girls. Released as a 12" single and 7" single on September 29, 1987, "Because of You" reached No. 27 on the Billboard Hot 100 chart in February 1988.

Charts

References

1987 singles
1987 songs
The Cover Girls songs
Songs written by David Cole (record producer)